Ctenane labuana is a moth of the family Nolidae. It was described by Charles Swinhoe in 1904. It is found on Borneo. The habitat consists of riverine forests, dipterocarp forests and alluvial forests.

Etymology
The species name refers to the type location, the island of Labuan.

References

Moths described in 1904
Nolidae
Moths of Borneo